Vogel is a 1922 m high mountain in Slovenia, part of southern Julian Alps and Triglav National Park. There is a cable car from Lake Bohinj to a height of 1537 m.

Vogel Ski Resort is one of the biggest of its kind in Slovenia.

Routes
 2½h from Ski hotel Vogel
 2¾h from Planina Kuk 
 3½h Planina Kuk via Globoko	
 3¾h from Planina Storeča raven 
 4½h from Ukanc via planina Zadnji Vogel

Gallery

References
 Slovenska planinska pot, Planinski vodnik, PZS, 2012, Milenko Arnejšek - Prle, Andraž Poljanec

External links 
 Vogel SKI center
 Vogel Description, Routes and Photos
 Vogel on summitpost.org

Mountains of the Julian Alps
Triglav National Park
One-thousanders of Slovenia